Gaspar Aquino de Belén was a Filipino poet and translator of the 17th century, known for authoring a 1704 rendition of the Pasyon: a famous work of Christian poetry about the passion, death and resurrection of Jesus, which has circulated in many versions.

Generally Filipino natives were not taught the Spanish language but the bilingual individuals, notably poet-translator Aquino de Belén, produced devotional poetry written in Latin script in the Tagalog language.

External links
https://web.archive.org/web/20080302162119/http://www.ncca.gov.ph/about_cultarts/comarticles.php?artcl_Id=139

Year of birth missing
Year of death missing
17th-century translators
18th-century Filipino poets
Filipino translators
People of Spanish colonial Philippines
Catholic poets
Early modern Christian devotional writers